The Chinese Taipei women's national volleyball team is the women's national volleyball team of Republic of China (Taiwan). (See Chinese Taipei for team naming issue) Controlled by Chinese Taipei Volleyball Association, it represents the country in international competitions and friendly matches.

After 16 years since 1990, Chinese Taipei women's national volleyball team re-entered FIVB Volleyball Women's World Championship in 2006. To everyone's surprise, the 23-ranked team gained their first-ever victory over the host Japan (7th) on the opening day, followed by defeated South Korea (8th), Poland (9th), Kenya (11th), and Costa Rica (33rd) in the first round. However, after a good start of five consecutive victories, the team could not continue their impressing form and eventually took the 12th place.

In December, the same squad attended the 2006 Asian Games held in Doha, Qatar. Although the team lost to South Korea and China in the preliminary round, they later beat Kazakhstan and Thailand and won the bronze medal, the first medal in women's volleyball at Asian Games.

Results

Olympic Games 

  1964 to  1996 –  Did not enter or Did not qualify
 2000 – Did not qualify
 2004 – Did not qualify
 2008 – Did not qualify
 2012 – Did not qualify
 2016 – Did not qualify

FIVB World Cup 

  1973 to   2015 – Did not qualify

World Championship 

  1952 to  1986 – Did not enter or Did not qualify
  1990 – 11th place
  1994 – Did not qualify
  1998 – Did not qualify
  2002 – Did not qualify
  2006 – 12th place
  2010 – Did not qualify
  2014 – Did not qualify
  2018 – Did not qualify

FIVB World Grand Prix 

  1994 – 12th place
  1995 to  2006 – Did not qualify
  2007 – 12th place
   2008 – Did not qualify
  2009 – Did not qualify
  2010 – 12th place
  2011 – Did not qualify
  2012 – 16th place
  2013 – Did not qualify
  2014 – Did not qualify
  2015 – Did not qualify
  2016 – Did not qualify
  2017 – Did not qualify

Asian Games 

  1994 – 4th place
  1998 – 5th place
  2002 – 4th place
  2006 –  Bronze medal
  2010 – 7th place
  2014 – 5th place
  2018 – 9th place

Asian Championship

  1983 – 4th place
  1987 – Did not participate
  1989 – 4th place
  1991 – 5th place
  1993 – 4th place
  1995 – 4th place
  1997 – 4th place
  1999 – 5th place
  2001 – 5th place
  2003 – 5th place
  2005 – 5th place
  2007 – 6th place
  2009 – 6th place
  2011 – 5th place
  2013 – 7th place
  2015 – 4th place
  2017 – 6th place
  2019 – 6th place
   2021  – Cancelled due to COVID-19 pandemic

Asian Cup

  2008 – 6th place
  2010 – 6th place
  2012 – 7th place
  2014 – 6th place
  2016 – 5th place
  2018 – 4th place
  2022 – 5th place

Current squad 

As of May 2023 Asian Women's Volleyball Championship 
 Coach: Lin Ming-Hui

Head coaches 

  Norimasa Sakakuchi (:jp:坂口憲政), 2009–2012
  Lin Ming-Hui (:ch:林明輝), 2013
  Ramazzo Federico, 2013
  Huang Chih-Nan (:ch:黃枝男), 2014
  Lin Ming-Hui (:ch:林明輝), 2015–present

See also 

 Chinese Taipei Volleyball Association
 Chinese Taipei men's national volleyball team

References

External links 

 Chinese Taipei women's national team at FIVB

Women's volleyball in Taiwan
National women's volleyball teams
Volleyball